John Newton Havers (born 1931) is a former English badminton international player and a former national doubles champion.

Biography
Havers became the English National doubles champion after winning the English National Badminton Championships in 1965 with his younger brother Bill Havers.

Havers played for Essex and England. He was also the 1964 and 1968 men's doubles runner-up with his brother  and the 1967 mixed doubles runner-up with his sister-in-law Patricia Page.

References 

English male badminton players
1931 births
Living people